Pineola  is an unincorporated community in Southeastern Citrus County, Florida. It is located in the southeastern part of the county, to the south of Floral City. It is along County Road 39 (South Istachatta Road) between the Hernando County-Citrus County Line north of Istachatta and County Road 48(East Bushnell Road). The ZIP Code for this community is 33536.

Pineola Grotto and lime mining
The Pineola Grotto (limestone caverns formed by sinkholes) as well as limestone bluffs were associated with the area. They provided specialized fern and other plant habitats and were once studied and documented by prominent botanists. Much has been lost to mining and other encroachments. A. H. Curtiss visited the grotto in 1881 and was followed by others. Several (12?) previously undiscovered species were identified at the chasm.

The community itself may have developed around the limestone industry in the early 1900s in conjunction with Pineola Lime Company and the mining of limestone quarries.

The area contains a few rural homes at present.

Great Train Wreck of 1956
Pineola was the site of what has been referred to as "The Great Train Wreck of 1956." On October 18, 1956, a head-on collision between two Atlantic Coast Line Railroad freight trains occurred killing four crewmen. A signpost at the site of the crash on the Withlacoochee State Trail memorializes the event.

The signpost at the site of the crash contains the following text describing the events.

The Great Train Wreck of 1956

You are standing on the site of one of the worst train disasters in Florida history. The tragedy occurred October 18 1956 , on a dark and foggy morning in Pineola. At 5:12 a.m. , people from five miles around were awakened when two freight trains collided head-on.

Catastrophe Unfolds

The trains, loaded with perishables and dry goods, were traveling on the same track full speed at 49 mph. Realizing they were on a collision course, Dunnellon Dispatcher Braddock phoned Croom Station agent Cooper, telling him to get in his car and "go see what you can find." Cooper and fellow agent Thomas raced 90 mph on an ungraded road to alert the engineers---but did not reach them in time.
At the sight of an oncoming headlight, the northbound train engineer slammed on emergency breaks as he yelled to his assistants to brace themselves for the crash.

An Ironic End

Four engines and 16 cars derailed. Four crewmen died, with fire engulfing the scene. Firefighters and hearses came from as far away as Tampa to offer assistance. 
Ironically, this tragedy might have been averted if recently installed radios had been put to use. However engineers had agreed to not use them until they received additional pay as radio operators. One of the casualties, Engineer B.J. Martin of No. 237, had been a leader in the holdout.

In Their Honor

We honor those who lost their lives in this tragic event:
Brakeman W.E. Snyder, No 118 Section 2
Engineer B.I. Martin, No 237
Fireman E.W. Vaughan, No. 237
Brakeman J.L. Phillips, No. 237
Engineer Otis Bridges and Fireman Welliam Hardee, Jr. were injured.

References

External links
Pineola, Florida (Florida Hometown Locator)

Unincorporated communities in Citrus County, Florida
Unincorporated communities in Florida